Darreh Zari-ye Ajam (also Romanized as Darreh Zarī-ye Ājam; also known as Darreh Raẕī) is a village in Ajam Rural District, Dishmok District, Kohgiluyeh County, Kohgiluyeh and Boyer-Ahmad Province, Iran. At the 2006 census, its population was 21, in 4 families.

References 

Populated places in Kohgiluyeh County